Sweet Wednesday is an American folk music duo from Boston, Massachusetts. The duo consists of singer-songwriters Dave Falk (vocals, guitar, mandolin, banjo, violin) and Lisa Housman (vocals, guitar).

Biography
Sweet Wednesday was formed in Boston, Massachusetts in early 2000 when Housman, a folk music artist met and started collaborating with Falk, a rock and blues musician. The duo write and perform in the roots rock, folk, alt country genres, combining elements of comedy, tragedy, and haunting beauty. Their music has been described to contain imagery likened to Joan Baez or Leonard Cohen

Members
 Dave Falk (vocals, guitar, mandolin, banjo, violin)
 Lisa Housman (vocals, guitar)

Discography
Studio albums
 Wherever You Go (2006)
 Escaping from the Pale Moonlight (2012)

Awards and nominations
 First place in the Great American Song Contest
 First place in the Dallas Song Competition
 Runner-up in the John Lennon Songwriting Contest

References

External links
 Sweet Wednesday official website
  No Depression: Album Review by Stacey Zering
  Your Country's Right Here: Prepare to Fall in Love with Sweet Wednesday by Nancy Dunham 
  Some Sweet Sounds from Sweet Wednesday by Jacques Fleury
  Rock 'n' Roll Trust: Review of "Escaping From The Pale Moonlight"

American musical duos
Musical groups established in 2005